Bandar Alkhorayef is the Minister of Industry and Mineral Resources in Saudi Arabia. He was appointed on 30 August 2019 to the newly formed industry that was created from the Ministry of Energy.

Education 
Alkhorayef holds a BA in international agriculture from King Saud University. He also earned several certificates from Switzerland's International Institute for Management Development in business administration and international business.

Career 
Alkhorayef is the top executive at Alkhorayef Group, as well as the vice-chairman of the Arabian Agricultural Services Company. In addition, Alkhorayef is a board member at Riyadh Chamber, the Saudi Economic Association, and the Saudi industrial council.

References 

King Saud University alumni
Living people
Year of birth missing (living people)
Industry ministers of Saudi Arabia